Jean Chouan is a 1926 French silent historical film directed by Luitz-Morat and starring René Navarre, Marthe Chaumont and Maurice Lagrenée. It is set at the time of the French Revolution, when Jean Chouan took part in a counterrevolutionary uprising.

Cast
 René Navarre as Maxime Ardouin - le délégué aux armées de la République  
 Marthe Chaumont as Marie-Claire, La fille de Maxime aimée de Jacques  
 Maurice Lagrenée as Jacques Cottereau  
 Maurice Schutz as Jean Cottereau / Jean Chouan - un vieux Vendéen royaliste  
 Claude Mérelle as Maryse Fleurus  
 Elmire Vautier as La marquise de Thorigné  
 Anna Lefeuvrier as Marie-Victoire Lefranc  
 Jean-Paul de Baere as Nicolas Lefranc  
 Albert Decoeur as Guillaume Lefranc  
 Jean Debucourt as Maximilien de Robespierre 
 René Vignières as Louis-Antoine de Saint-Just  
 Daniel Mendaille as François Marceau 
 Thomy Bourdelle as Kléber 
 Paul Amiot as Le marquis de Thorigné 
 Yvette Armel 
 William Burke as Jean-Marie Collot d'Herbois  
 Jacques Cléry as La Rochejaquelein  
 Engeldorff
 Marthe Jessy 
 Maurice Mariaud 
 Ray-Roy 
 Cesar-Tullio Terrore as Pierre Florent

References

Bibliography 
 Dayna Oscherwitz. Past Forward: French Cinema and the Post-Colonial Heritage. SIU Press, 2010.

External links 
 

1926 films
French historical films
1920s historical films
French silent films
1920s French-language films
Films directed by Luitz-Morat
Films set in the 18th century
French black-and-white films
1920s French films